Atlético Clube de Vila Meã (abbreviated as AC Vila Meã) is a Portuguese football club based in Vila Meã, Amarante in the district of Porto.

Background
AC Vila Meã currently plays in the Terceira Divisão Série B which is the fourth tier of Portuguese football. The club was founded in 1944 and they play their home matches at the Estádio Municipal de Vila Meã in Vila Meã, Amarante. The stadium is able to accommodate 4,500 spectators.

The club is affiliated to Associação de Futebol do Porto and has competed in the AF Porto Taça. The club has also entered the national cup competition known as Taça de Portugal on occasions.

Season to season

Honours
Terceira Divisão: 	2005/06
AF Porto Divisão de Honra: 2004/05

Notable former managers
 Aloísio Pires Alves
 Eduardo Luís
 Vítor Paneira

Footnotes

External links
Official website 

Football clubs in Portugal
Association football clubs established in 1944
1944 establishments in Portugal